Australia's Brainiest is a television game show series produced in Australia by Crackerjack Productions, a FremantleMedia company. It originally aired on the Seven Network before moving to Network Ten. The format was taken from the British series Britain's Brainiest Kid.

The first season of Australia's Brainiest Kid was produced in May 2004, airing on the Seven Network on Sundays, starting 28 November 2004. It was hosted by Anna Coren. It was publicised through Australian primary schools, with children sitting an online test, followed by a selection of them taking a supervised written test. Of those that scored highly on these written tests, some of the highest scoring children appeared on the show as contestants. A second season was produced in 2005, and was broadcast on Network Ten at 6:30 pm on Sundays, starting 25 September 2005. It was hosted by Ten News newsreader Sandra Sully and co-hosted by Samuel Shaed.

The second season of Australia's Brainiest Kid was followed by a series of specials on Network Ten featuring celebrities, reality TV contestants and sports stars, under the Australia's Brainiest Specials title. After the broadcast of the specials no further series have been commissioned.

Australia's Brainiest Kid 
The format of Australia's Brainiest Kid went unchanged during its transition from Seven Network to Network Ten, except for the number of rounds and contestants. In Seven Network's version, there were 4 heats and a final, and 12 children per show; in Network Ten's version, there were 7 heats and a final, and 9 children per show.

Season 1 
The first season aired on the Seven Network in 2004. Over 5000 children sat the online test, 800 were selected to sit the supervised test. All of them won copies of the 2004 CD-ROM edition of Encyclopædia Britannica.

Everybody in the third round went on to the final; they were competing for an Apple Computer iBook. The winner of the first series final, Aaron Chong, won the title of "Australia's Brainiest Kid" and A$20,000 to be held in trust until he turns 18.

Season 2 
The second season aired on Network Ten in 2005. 12,000 children sat the online test for the second season of Australia's Brainiest Kid, aired on Network Ten.  Some of them were selected to sit the supervised test. The seven winners of the heats, plus two others who made it into the final rounds of the heats played in the final. This series had considerably more children participating, mainly due to the popularity of the first series.

All contestants received a Mathemagic computer tutor from the Australian Institute of Mathematics as a "participation" prize. The heat winners received ASUS laptops. The winner of the second series final, William Xi, won the title of "Australia's Brainiest Kid" and a trust fund worth A$20,000 that he cannot touch before his 18th birthday.

Commentators noted that children of Asian descent dominated the preliminary televised rounds during this series. The Chaser's War on Everything parodied the series with an advertisement for "Australia's Brainiest Non-Asian Kid," in which a Caucasian contestant is unable to answer "What's two plus three?" correctly. The parody ended with promos for dozens of supposed upcoming Australia's Brainiest episodes featuring numerous animals, inanimate objects, and three subliminal messages.

Australia's Brainiest Specials 

Network Ten's specials pitted celebrities, sports stars and reality TV contestants from Ten's shows against each other with the winner given the opportunity to donate money to a charity of their choice. Episodes of Australia's Brainiest were normally rated G.

Australia's Brainiest Comedian
Australia's Brainiest Comedian aired on 24 November 2005, and was repeated on 16 April 2006. This episode of Australia's Brainiest was given the television rating of PG, for mild coarse language.

Contestants
Mikey Robins (Winner)
Red Symons (Runner-up)
Bob Downe (Runner-up)
Peter Berner
Hamish Blake
Greg Fleet
Libbi Gorr
Colin Lane
Andy Lee

Australia's Brainiest TV Star
Aired on 12 February 2006. It was repeated on 28 December 2006.

Contestants
Julia Zemiro (Winner)
Andrew G (Runner-up)
Gary Sweet (Runner-up)
James Mathison
Axel Whitehead
Kate Kendall
Paul Mercurio
Mark Holden
Ann-Maree Biggar

Australia's Brainiest Quiz Master
Australia's Brainiest Quiz Master aired on 19 February 2006, and featured winners from Nine Network's Who Wants to Be a Millionaire?, Sale of the Century and Temptation. It was  repeated on 21 December 2006.

Contestants
Stephen Hall (Winner)
Rob Fulton (Runner-up)
William Laing (Runner-up)
Martin Flood
Maria McCabe
Virginia Noel
Brigid O'Connor
Trevor Sauer
Cary Young

Australia's Brainiest Housemate 
Australia's Brainiest Housemate aired on 26 February 2006, and featured Big Brother Australia housemates from the first five seasons.

Contestants
Jemma Gawned (Winner)
Chrissie Swan (Runner-up)
Tim Brunero (Runner-up)
Bree Amer
Trevor Butler
Jess Hardy
Saxon Small
Pete Timbs
Greg Mathew

Australia's Brainiest Radio Star
Australia's Brainiest Radio Star aired on 5 March 2006, and the contestants were radio announcers from major FM networks such as DMG, Macquarie Radio Network, and Austereo. It was repeated on 7 December 2006.

Contestants
Tom Gleeson (Winner)
Jo Stanley (Runner-up)
Barry Bissell (Runner-up)
John Blackman
Brigitte Duclos
Bianca Dye
Samuel Johnson
Amanda Keller

Australia's Brainiest Olympian
Australia's Brainiest Olympian aired on 12 March 2006. The winner's prize money was donated to K.I.D.S. Foundation, a children's charity.

Contestants
Steve Moneghetti (Winner)
Neil Brooks (Runner-up)
Matt Welsh (Runner-up)
Steven Bradbury
Elka Graham
Shane Kelly
Tamsyn Lewis
Nova Peris-Kneebone
Kerri Pottharst

Australia's Brainiest Musician
Australia's Brainiest Musician aired on 19 March 2006. The winner's prize money was donated to Club Friday.

Contestants
Phil Burton (Winner)
Toby Allen (Runner-up)
Dave Graney (Runner-up)
Angry Anderson
James Blundell
Cosima De Vito
Leo Sayer
Melissa Tkautz
Katie Underwood

Australia's Brainiest Neighbour
Australia's Brainiest Neighbour aired on 26 March 2006.  The contestants were actors whose characters were in soap opera Neighbours at the time of its broadcast. The winner's prize money was donated to Open Family Australia.

Contestants
Stephen Lovatt (Winner)
Nell Feeney (Runner-up)
Caitlin Stasey (Runner-up)
Stefan Dennis
Patrick Harvey
Blair McDonough
Ben Nicholas
Brett Swain
Eliza Taylor-Cotter

Australia's Brainiest Footballer
Aired on 2 April 2006, featuring players from the various codes of football such as soccer, AFL, Rugby Union and Rugby league. The winner's prize money was donated to the McGuinness McDermott Foundation.

Contestants
Adam Kingsley (Winner)
Nathan Buckley (Runner-up)
Michael Crocker (Runner-up)
Andrew Ettinghausen
Peter Everitt
Josh Hannay
Jeremy Paul
Jade Rawlings

Australia's Brainiest Cricketer
Australia's Brainiest Cricketer aired on 9 April 2006, and contestants were Australian cricketers.

Contestants
Paul Reiffel (Winner)
Greg Blewett
Ray Bright
Damien Fleming
Rodney Hogg
Kim Hughes
Geoff Lawson
Greg Matthews
Colin Miller

Australia's Brainiest Loser
Aired on 6 August 2006, it featured all of the contestants from the first Australian season of The Biggest Loser. The winner's prize money was donated to the Australian Red Cross.

Contestants
Jo Cowling (Winner)
Kristie Dignam (Runner-up)
Shane Giles (Runner-up)
Ruth Almeida De Campos
Fiona Falkiner
David Hilyander
Harry Kantzidis
Tracy Moores
Vladimir "Big Wal" Milberg
Adriano Sarnelli
Artie Rocke
Cat White

Australia's Brainiest BB06 Housemate
Australia's Brainiest BB06 Housemate aired on 13 August 2006, and featured nine housemates from Big Brother 2006.  David donated his prize money to Parents, Families and Friends of Lesbians and Gays.  This episode was classified PG without consumer advice. It was repeated on Thursday 14 December 2006.

Contestants
David Graham (Winner)
Dino Delic (Runner-up)
Jamie Brooksby (Runner-up)
Claire Madden
Gaelan Walker
Katie Hastings
Camilla Severi
Anna Lind-Hansen
Michael McCoy

Australia's Brainiest Comedian 2
Australia's Brainiest Comedian 2 aired on 17 August 2006, and featured an all new batch of Australian comedians. The winner's prize money was donated to Anaphylaxis Australia. This episode was classified PG without consumer advice.

Contestants
Peter Helliar (Winner)
Cal Wilson (Runner-up)
Dave Hughes (Runner-up)
Dave O'Neil
Russell Gilbert
Jodie Hill
Corinne Grant
Frank Woodley
Richard Stubbs

Australia's Brainiest Idol
Australia's Brainiest Idol aired on 20 August 2006, and featured former contestants from the reality-TV series, Australian Idol. It was repeated on 25 November 2006 on the eve of the Australian Idol fourth-season finale.

Contestants
 Marty Worrall (Winner)
 Dan O'Connor (Runner-up)
 Amali Ward (Runner-up)
 Kate DeAraugo
 Casey Donovan
 Dan England
 Lee Harding
 Hayley Jensen
 Em Rusciano

References

External links
 

2000s Australian game shows
Seven Network original programming
English-language television shows
Network 10 original programming
2004 Australian television series debuts
2006 Australian television series endings
Television series by Fremantle (company)